Robert Joseph Schmitz (September 10, 1938 – June 8, 2004) was an American football linebacker who played professionally in the National Football League for the Pittsburgh Steelers.  Schmitz graduated from New Holstein High School in New Holstein, Wisconsin.  He then went on to initially attend college at University of Wisconsin–Madison, then at Montana State University where he earned a Bachelor's degree in Business Administration.

Playing career
Schmitz was drafted by the Pittsburgh Steelers in the 14th round of the 1961 NFL Draft.  Schmitz was also drafted in the 1960 American Football League Draft by the Oakland Raiders, but he chose the Steelers.  He is most notable for playing linebacker for the Pittsburgh Steelers from 1961 to 1966.  Schmitz played in a total of 51 NFL games.  During his career he recorded three interceptions for 65 yards and a touchdown.  Also, he recorded one safety from the linebacker spot.  Perhaps his most memorable moment came at Pitt Stadium on November 10, 1963 where he recorded his only safety.  Schmitz tackled Pro Football Hall of Fame running back Jim Brown of the Cleveland Browns in the end zone for a safety that gave the Steelers a 9–7 victory.  Schmitz was then named NFL Player of the Week for his winning score.  After winning the honor Schmitz said, "Gee, that's probably the best thing that ever happened to me."  His last season in the NFL came in 1966; a season in which he split time between the Pittsburgh Steelers and the Minnesota Vikings.

Scouting
After his playing career ended Schmitz took up scouting in the NFL.  In 1971, he was hired by the NFL's BLESTO combine, a scouting service that was located in Pittsburgh.  He joined the Pittsburgh Steelers as an area scout in 1976 after being hired by Art Rooney, Jr.  Schmitz worked for the Steelers until 1995.  Schmitz then accepted a scouting job for the New York Jets in 1995 because he was offered more money by his former boss with the Steelers Dick Haley. Schmitz assisted the Jets with their drafts and college free agent signing periods. Throughout his career Schmitz specialty was grading defensive players.  Schmitz retired as a scout on June 1, 2004 after a successful 33-year run.

Death
On June 8, 2004, Schmitz  took a late-morning nap at his home in Glendale, Arizona and never woke up .  His death was ruled an apparent heart attack. Bob Schmitz was 65 years old.

References

External links
Obituary from NFL.com
Obituary from the Pittsburgh Post-Gazette

1939 births
2004 deaths
American people of German descent
People from Calumet, Wisconsin
People from New Holstein, Wisconsin
Players of American football from Wisconsin
American football linebackers
Wisconsin Badgers football players
Montana State Bobcats football players
Pittsburgh Steelers players
Minnesota Vikings players
Pittsburgh Steelers scouts